Akira Fitzgerald (Japanese: フィッツジェラルド・アキラ Fittsujerarudo Akira) (born July 17, 1987) is a Japanese professional footballer who plays for USL League One club Richmond Kickers as a goalkeeper.

Career

College and amateur
After redshirting his freshman year at Wake Forest, Fitzgerald made four appearances in 2007 and posted a 1-0-1 record.  In 2008, Fitzgerald started every game for the Demon Deacons and finished with 13 clean sheets on the season and was named to ACC Honor Roll.  Fitzgerald had another solid year in 2009 as he posted a 17-4-3 record in his junior season and was named to ACC Honor Roll for the second year in a row.  Despite a rough senior season in 2010 with an 8-9-2 record, Fitzgerald still finished with a 1.23 goals against average, an ACC-best 81 saves, was named Second Team All-ACC and was one of 30 candidates for the 2010 Lowe's Senior CLASS Award for men's soccer.

During his time in college, Fitzgerald also spent two season with USL Premier Development League club Cary Clarets.

Professional

Carolina Railhawks
Fitzgerald joined North American Soccer League club Carolina RailHawks in July 2011.

New York City FC and Loan to Railhawks
After four seasons with the club, his contract ended and he was signed on a free transfer by expansion club New York City FC ahead of the 2014 season. 

However, Akira never made an appearance for NYFC, and on May 19, 2015, it was announced Fitzgerald would be re-joining the RailHawks on loan through the NASL's spring season.

Second Permanent Stint with Railhawks
Fitzgerald was waived by New York City on 24 June 2015, going on to re-sign with Carolina RailHawks on 2 July 2015.

Tampa Bay Rowdies
Fitzgerald joined USL side Tampa Bay Rowdies ahead of their inaugural 2017 season in the league, where he would make 13 appearances between 2017 and 2018.

Richmond Kickers
Fitzgerald joined the Richmond Kickers on 6 February 2019, ahead of the inaugural USL League One season. He has served as the club's primary goalkeeper over subsequent seasons, making 116 appearances through 2022.

Akira received a nomination for USL League One Goalkeeper of the Year in 2019 after ranking second in the league with 9 clean sheets.

Akira was named USL League One Goalkeeper of the Year and given All-League First Team honors in 2021, leading the league with 10 clean sheets, 89 saves and a 72.1% save percentage. Following the season, he re-signed for two years to remain in Richmond through 2023.

In 2022, he led the league in saves, had six clean sheets and was nominated for USL League One Goalkeeper of the Year, and given USL League One All-League Second Team honors.

Honors

Individual
USL League One All-League First Team: 2021
USL League One All-League Second Team: 2022
USL League One Goalkeeper of the Year: 2021
USL League One Goalkeeper of the Year nominee: 2019, 2022

References

External links
 
 Wake Forest University bio

1987 births
Living people
Japanese footballers
Japanese people of American descent
Association football goalkeepers
Association football people from Chiba Prefecture
Baltimore Blast (2008–2014 MISL) players
Cary Clarets players
Major Indoor Soccer League (2008–2014) players
New York City FC players
North American Soccer League players
North Carolina FC players
People from Chiba (city)
Richmond Kickers players
Soccer players from Baltimore
Tampa Bay Rowdies players
USL Championship players
USL League One players
USL League Two players
Wake Forest Demon Deacons men's soccer players